Hylton-Foster is a surname. Notable people include:

Audrey Hylton-Foster, Baroness Hylton-Foster (1908–2002), daughter of Douglas Clifton Brown, 1st Viscount
Harry Hylton-Foster (1905–1965), British Conservative Party politician

See also
Hilton (surname)
Foster (surname)

Compound surnames
English-language surnames